Major-General James Robert Brunker (22 December 1806 – 24 March 1869) was Commander of British Troops in China and Hong Kong.

Military career
Brunker was commissioned into the 91st Regiment of Foot in 1825. He was appointed adjutant of his regiment in 1829.

He went on to be deputy adjutant-general in Ceylon in 1852 before being appointed Inspecting Field Officer for the Recruiting District in 1860.

He was promoted to major-general in 1865 and then made Commander of British Troops in China and Hong Kong in 1867.

He died in Hong Kong in 1869 and is buried at Hong Kong Cemetery.

Family
He married Marianne Molyneaux.

References

1806 births
1869 deaths
British Army major generals
Argyll and Sutherland Highlanders officers
Commanders of Hong Kong
East Yorkshire Regiment officers
Military personnel from Dublin (city)